Death, Desire and Loss in Western Culture is a 1998 philosophy book by the social theorist Jonathan Dollimore. The book describes the influence of the death obsession in western culture. Dollimore's analysis is heavily influenced by early modern culture.

Notes

1998 non-fiction books
Books about death
Books by Jonathan Dollimore
English-language books
Sociology books